Viva Air was an airline from Spain that operated during the 1980s and 1990s.

History

Viva Air, whose complete name in Spanish was Vuelos Internacionales de Vacaciones (International Vacation Flights,) was founded on 24 February 1988 by Iberia and Lufthansa.

Operations began with a320 aircraft.  At the beginning flights were mostly from Germany to Spain, in particular to Palma de Mallorca. By 1992, the partnership between Lufthansa and Iberia dissolved and Iberia took over the operations of Viva Air.  Shortly thereafter, Viva Air entered the Spanish domestic scheduled market using Douglas DC-9 aircraft but those were quickly replaced by the Boeing 737-300.

The airline's aircraft stood out with their simple and colourful Joan Miró-style livery created by Spanish school children. It was intended to symbolise the Spanish sunshine which most of its passengers sought during their holidays. After the first few years of operation, the airline was one of the first subsidiary airlines of a major carrier (in this case IBERIA) to gain a foothold into London's Heathrow Airport from where Viva operated several scheduled services on behalf of its parent company using Viva callsigns and Viva flight numbers.

Since the scheduled flights were losing money, Iberia took over those routes and Viva Air was relegated to charter flights using Boeing 737-300 aircraft of which it had 10 in service by 1995.

Owing to heavy competition from other Spanish and European charter companies, Viva Air began to lose money and, by 1999, operations ceased and the airline was liquidated. Iberia took over all staff, aircraft and route licenses.

Fleet
3 - Douglas DC-9-32
10 - Boeing 737-300

See also
List of defunct airlines of Spain

References

External links

1988 establishments in Spain
1998 disestablishments in Spain
Defunct airlines of Spain
Airlines established in 1988
Airlines disestablished in 1998
Iberia (airline)